"What Am I" is a song performed by American boy band Why Don't We. The song was released as a digital download on August 22, 2019 by Signature and Atlantic Records. The song peaked at number twenty on the US Bubbling Under Hot 100 Singles chart. The song was written by Ammar Malik, Ed Sheeran and Steve Mac, who also produced the song.

Background
The song was co-written by Ed Sheeran, he was also co-writer on the single "Trust Fund Baby". In August 2019, the band announced the release of their new single of their social media accounts.

Music video
A music video to accompany the release of "What Am I" was first released onto YouTube on August 23, 2019. The video was directed by Andy Hines and shows the band having a celebratory end-of-summer bonfire on the beach.

Track listing

Personnel
Credits adapted from Tidal. 
 Steve Mac – Producer, keyboards, writer
 Chris Laws – Drums, engineer
 Dann Pursey – Engineer
 Duncan Fuller – Engineer
 Mike Horner – Engineer
 Ed Sheeran – Guitar, writer
 Chris Gehringer – Masterer
 Serban Ghenea – Mixer
 John Hanes – Mixing Engineer
 Dave Arch – Strings
 Ammar Malik – Writer
 Corbyn Besson – Vocals
 Daniel Seavey – Vocals
 Jack Avery – Vocals
 Jonah Marais – Vocals
 Zach Herron – Vocals

Charts

Certifications

Release history

References

2019 songs
Why Don't We songs
Songs written by Ed Sheeran
Songs written by Ammar Malik
Songs written by Steve Mac